The Unforgiven is a 2005 South Korean drama film directed by Yoon Jong-bin. Turning painful experiences of his own compulsory military service into a narrative of three young men, director Yoon presses the hot-button issue of military service in contemporary South Korea. Yoon's controversial exposé of psychological and physical violence within the ranks stimulated a national dialogue on the subject.

Plot 
Lee Seung-young is a new recruit in the South Korean military who finds that his commanding officer, Sergeant Yoo Tae-jeong is an old school friend. Yoo looks after Lee, and tries to help the stubborn and contrary youngster adjust to the strict hierarchies and harshness of military life. As time passes, Lee's resistance wears down, and he finds himself understanding, and even becoming more like the superior officers he previously struggled against. Matters come to a head when he is given command of Heo Ji-hoon, a slovenly newcomer whose constant incompetence tests Lee's patience, and eventually forces him to act.

Cast 
 Ha Jung-woo as Yoo Tae-jeong
 Seo Jang-won as Lee Seung-young
 Yoon Jong-bin as Heo Ji-hoon
 Lim Hyun-sung as Soo-dong
 Han Sung-chun as Dae-seok
 Sohn Sang-bum as Young-il
 Kim Sung-mi as Ji-hye
 Joo Hyun-woo as Senior 1
 Park Min-kwan as Sergeant
 Seo Jung-joon as Casher
 Kim Byung-joon as Drunken Man
 Lee Hye-min as Soo-hyun

Reception 
The Unforgiven was a feature-length graduation thesis film from director Yoon Jong-bin, then an undergraduate in Chung-Ang University film school. Despite its rough edges due to technical limitations and a low budget, the film was a smash hit at the 2005 Busan International Film Festival and won the following awards: Best Korean Feature, Most Popular Film in the New Currents section, FIPRESCI, and NETPAC ("for its critical reflection on 'masculinity', not only in South Korea or the military, but in contemporary society in general"). This generated wide publicity for the film, giving it a chance to be shown at respectable arthouse theaters in Seoul. Unfortunately, director Yoon found himself the object of litigation by the Defense Department, when the film turned out to be a far cry from the heartwarming "story of friendship inside the barracks" the Defense Department had apparently read in screenplay form, before they granted Yoon permission to shoot his film inside the authentic living quarters. Yoon acknowledged his act of deception and stated that he will accept the appropriate punishment.

Not only does the film deal with the difficult and formerly taboo subject of mandatory military service in South Korea, but it does so with an admirable level of thoughtfulness and honesty. Koreanfilm.org describes the film's last scene as "one of the most painfully honest renderings of young Korean men seen in a Korean film, whose souls are eaten away by the price they paid for having 'adjusted' themselves to become good soldiers and upstanding 'real men'. The Unforgiven is a must-see for anyone who seeks to gain insight into the inner psychology of South Korean men, and a stupendously promising debut for yet another talented Korean filmmaker."

The film also screened in the Un Certain Regard section of the 2006 Cannes Film Festival.

Awards and nominations

References

External links 
  
 
 
 
 The Unforgiven at Korean Film Biz Zone

2005 films
2005 drama films
South Korean drama films
Films about suicide
Films directed by Yoon Jong-bin
2005 directorial debut films
Chungeorahm Films films
2000s Korean-language films
2000s South Korean films